Route 69, or Highway 69, may refer to:

International
 European route E69

Australia
 Appin Road

Canada
 Alberta Highway 69
 Ontario Highway 69

China 
  G69 Expressway

Finland
 Finnish national road 69

India
 National Highway 69 (India)
State Highway 69 (Kerala)

Ireland
 N69 road (Ireland)

Korea, South
Gukjido 69

New Zealand
 New Zealand State Highway 69

Philippines
 N69 highway (Philippines)

Poland 
  National road 69 (former, 2000–2016)

United Kingdom
A69 road 
M69 motorway

United States
 Interstate 69
 Interstate 69W
 Interstate 69C
 Interstate 69E
 U.S. Route 69
 Alabama State Route 69
 Arizona State Route 69
 Arkansas Highway 69
 California State Route 69 (former)
 Colorado State Highway 69
 Connecticut Route 69
 Florida State Road 69
 County Road 69 (Calhoun County, Florida)
 Georgia State Route 69 (former)
 Idaho State Highway 69
 Illinois Route 69 (former)
 Indiana State Road 69
 Kentucky Route 69
 Louisiana Highway 69
 Maine State Route 69
 Maryland Route 69 (former)
 Massachusetts Route 69 (former)
 M-69 (Michigan highway)
 Minnesota State Highway 69 (former)
 County Road 69 (Scott County, Minnesota)
 Mississippi Highway 69
Missouri Route 69 (1922) (former)
 Montana Highway 69
 Nebraska Highway 69
 Nevada State Route 69 (former)
 New Jersey Route 69 (former)
 County Route 69 (Bergen County, New Jersey)
 County Route 69 (Ocean County, New Jersey)
 New York State Route 69
 County Route 69 (Chautauqua County, New York)
 County Route 69 (Chemung County, New York)
 County Route 69 (Dutchess County, New York)
 County Route 69 (Jefferson County, New York)
 County Route 69 (Orange County, New York)
 County Route 69 (Rockland County, New York)
 County Route 69 (Schenectady County, New York)
 County Route 69 (Suffolk County, New York)
 County Route 69 (Warren County, New York)
 North Carolina Highway 69
 North Dakota Highway 69 (former)
 Ohio State Route 69 (former)
 Oregon Route 69 (former; never signed)
 Pennsylvania Route 69
 Tennessee State Route 69
 Texas State Highway 69 (pre-1939) (former)
 Texas State Highway 69 (1971–1992) (former)
 Texas State Highway Spur 69
 Farm to Market Road 69 (Texas)
 Texas Park Road 69
 Utah State Route 69 (former)
 Virginia State Route 69
 West Virginia Route 69
 Wisconsin Highway 69

Territories
 U.S. Virgin Islands Highway 69

See also
List of highways numbered 69A
A69 road